Sea of Faces is the second full-length album released by Christian rock group Kutless, released through BEC Records in 2004. The song "Treason" was once the No. 1 song on ChristianRock.net, and Sea of Faces in the Top 5. The album reached No. 97 on the Billboard 200, the first time the band was on that chart, and No. 3 on the Billboard Top Christian Albums, the first top ten on this chart. "All of the Words" was featured in an episode of Scrubs titled "My Bright Idea". It is the first album to feature bassist Kyle Zeigler.

Track listing

Personnel 

Kutless
 Jon Micah Sumrall – lead vocals, acoustic guitar
 James Mead – rhythm guitar, backing vocals
 Ryan Shrout – lead guitar, backing vocals
 Kyle Zeigler – bass guitar
 Kyle Mitchell – drums, percussion

Additional vocals
 Benjiman (on "Let You In")
 Ryan Clark (on "Let You In")

Production
 Aaron Sprinkle – producer, engineer 
 Brandon Ebel – executive producer 
 J.R. McNeely – mixing 
 Brian Gardner – mastering at Bernie Grundman Mastering, Hollywood, California
 Zach Hodges – mastering assistant 
 Aaron Mlasko – drum technician 
 Asterik Studio – art direction, design 
 Kris McCaddon – photography

Music videos

The video of "Not What You See" consists of the band playing on a stage in a white room. Powder is on the stage which adds to the visual of the band jumping up and down. The video appears to be in black and white but actually has some color to it.

The video of "Sea of Faces" shows the band playing in a dark room much like their video for "Run". Also shows is Jon Micah Sumrall walking along the streets along with many other different people.

Awards

On 2005, the album was nominated for a Dove Award for Rock Album of the Year at the 36th GMA Dove Awards.

References

Kutless albums
BEC Recordings albums
2004 albums
Tooth & Nail Records albums
Albums produced by Aaron Sprinkle